John Russell Fearn (1908–1960) was a British writer, one of the first to appear in American pulp science fiction magazines. A prolific author, he published his novels also as Vargo Statten and with various pseudonyms including Thornton Ayre, Polton Cross, Geoffrey Armstrong, John Cotton, Dennis Clive, Ephriam Winiki, Astron Del Martia.

Career
Fearn was a prolific writer who wrote Westerns and crime fiction as well as science fiction. His writing appeared under numerous pseudonyms.  He wrote series such as Adam Quirke, Clayton Drew, Golden Amazon, and Herbert.  At times these drew on the pulp traditions of Edgar Rice Burroughs. His work received praise for its vividness, but criticism, being deemed "unpolished", with Arthur C. Clarke commenting in 1939 that "we must admire the magnificent, if undisciplined, fertility of his mind".

Personal life
Child of a cotton salesman and a secretary, Fearn worked initially for his father's firm, followed by work as a solicitor's clerk, fairground assistant, at a munitions factory, and as a cinema projectionist. He married writer Camilla Fegan in 1957.
As well as writing he was involved in writing/acting in local plays and active in writers' groups.  In 1938, he told Amazing Stories that he "likes broiling sunlight and heated rooms [and] smokes incessantly while he writes". During the Second World War, Fearn was chief projectionist at the Empire Cinema in Blackpool.

Bibliography

As himself
The Intelligence Gigantic (1933 Amazing Stories; 1943)
Liners of Time (1935 Amazing Stories; 1947) and its sequel
"Zagribud" (1937 Amazing Stories; cut variant title Science Metropolis as by Vargo Statten 1952)
He Never Slept (1934 Astounding Stories; 1934)
Nebula X (1946 as "The Multillionth Chance"; revised 1950)
The Sun Makers (1937 as "Metamorphosis"; revised 1950)
The Avenging Martian (1938 as "Red Heritage"; revised 1950)
The Renegade Star (1938 as "The Blue Infinity"; revised 1951)
The Inner Cosmos (1937 as "Worlds Within"; revised 1952)
To the Ultimate (1936 as "Mathematica"; revised 1952)
The Dust Destroyer (1934 as "The Man who Stopped the Dust"; revised 1953)
The Arbiter (1947)
The Gold of Akada (1951)
Anjani the Mighty (1951)
The Creature from the Black Lagoon (1954 as by Vargo Statten) novelisation of 1954 film
Slaves of Ijax (1947 chap)
From Afar (1982 chap)
No Grave Need I (1984 chap)
The Slitherers (1984 chap)

Golden Amazon
The Golden Amazon (1939)
The Amazon Fights Again (1940)
The Golden Amazon Returns (1945; 1949 variant title The Deathless Amazon 1953 Canada)The Golden Amazon's Triumph (1946; 1953)The Amazon's Diamond Quest (1947 as "Diamond Quest"; 1953)Twin of the Amazon (1948; 1954)The Amazon Strikes Again (1948; 1954)Conquest of the Amazon (1949; 1973 chap)Lord of Atlantis (1949; 1991)Triangle of Power (1950)Amethyst City (1951)Daughter of Golden Amazon (1952)Quorne Returns (1952)The Central Intelligence (1953)The Cosmic Crusaders (1955)Parasite Planet (1955)World Out of Step (1956)The Shadow People (1957)Kingpin Planet (1957)World in Reverse (1958)Dwellers in Darkness (1958)World in Duplicate (1959)Lord of CreationDuel with ColossusStandstill Planet (1960)Ghost World (1961)Earth Divided (1961)Chameleon Planet (with Philip Harbottle)

Mars Quartet (Clayton Drew)Emperor of Mars (1950)Warrior of Mars (1950)Red Men of Mars (1950)Goddess of Mars (1950)

Works written under pseudonymsWhat Happened to Hammond? (1951) as by Hugo BlaynValley of Pretenders (circa 1942 chap US) as by Dennis CliveThe Voice Commands (circa 1942 chap US) as by Dennis CliveOther Eyes Watching (1946) as by Polton CrossThe Trembling World (1949) as by Astron Del Martia.  There is another novel One Against Time as by Astron Del Martia stated to have been written by JRF.  This is incorrect.  It was in fact written by Stephen D. Frances.Don't Touch Me (1953) as by Spike GordonThe Dyno-Depressent (1953) as by Volsted GridbanMagnetic Brain (1953) as by Volsted GridbanMoons for Sale (1953) as by Volsted GridbanScourge of the Atom (1953 as "After the Atom" by JRF; revised 1953) as by Volsted GridbanA Thing of the Past (1953) as by Volsted GridbanThe Genial Dinosaur (1954)Exit Life (1941 as "The World in Wilderness" as by Thornton Ayre; revised 1953) as by Volsted GridbanThe Master Must Die (1953) as by Volsted GridbanThe Lonely Astronomer (partly based on "Death at the Observatory" as by JRF; 1954) as by Volsted GridbanThe Purple Wizard (1953) as by Volsted GridbanThe Frozen Limit (1954) as by Volsted GridbanI Came - I Saw - I Wondered (1954) as by Volsted GridbanLiquid Death (1954) as by "Griff"Cosmic Exodus (1953 chap) as by Conrad G. HoltDark Boundaries (1953) as by Paul LorraineThe Hell-Fruit (1953 chap) as by Lawrence F. RoseAccount Settled (1949) as by John RussellZ-Formations (1953) as by Brian Shaw

Work written under the name Vargo StattenOperation Venus (1950)Annihilation (1950)The Micro-Men (1950)Wanderer of Space (1950)2000 Years On (1950)Inferno! (1950)The Cosmic Flame (1950)Cataclysm (Statten)|Cataclysm (1944 as "The Devouring Tide" as by Polton Cross; revised 1951)The Red Insects (1951)The New Satellite (1951)Deadline to Pluto (1951)The Petrified Planet (1951)Born of Luna (1951)The Devouring Fire (1951)The Catalyst (1951)The Space Warp (1952)The Eclipse Express (1952)The Time Bridge (1942 as "Prisoner of Time" by Polton Cross; revised 1952)The Man from Tomorrow (1950 as "Stranger in our Midst" by JRF; revised 1952)The G-Bomb (1941 as "The Last Secret Weapon" by Polton Cross; revised 1952)Laughter in Space (1939 as "Laughter out of Space" by Dennis Clive; revised 1952)Across the Ages (1952 as "Glimpse" by JRF; 1952 chap)The Last Martian (1952 chap)Worlds to Conquer (1952 chap)De-Creation (1952 chap)The Time Trap (1952 chap)Ultra Spectrum (1953)Black-Wing of Mars (1953 as "Winged Pestilence" by JRF; 1953)Man in Duplicate (1953)Zero Hour (1952 as "Deadline" by JRF; 1953)The Black Avengers (1953)Odyssey of Nine (1953)Pioneer 1990 (1940 as "He Conquered Venus" by JRF; revised 1953)The Interloper (1953)Man of Two Worlds (1953)The Lie Destroyer (1953)Black Bargain (1953)The Grand Illusion (1953)Wealth of the Void (1954)A Time Appointed (1954)I Spy (1954)The Multi-Man (1954)1,000 Year Voyage (1954)Earth 2 (1955)

Writing about Fearn
 The Multi-Man (1968 chap) by Philip Harbottle
  Science Fiction and Fantasy Literature, Volume 2 by R. Reginald

See also

 Ron Turner – an illustrator closely associated with the Vargo Statten pseudonym
 Vargo Statten Science Fiction Magazine''

References

External links 
 
 

1908 births
1960 deaths
British science fiction writers
Pulp fiction writers
20th-century British novelists